Cosplay Melee is a Syfy channel reality television show executive produced by Jay Peterson and Todd Lubin, which was announced in February 2017 and premiered its first season of six episodes on March 21, 2017. The series is hosted by Yvette Nicole Brown, and follows cosplayers as they put their skills to the test. Cosplay Melee is Syfy's second cosplay-competition series, after the two-season series Heroes of Cosplay in 2013.

Premise
The series is hosted by Yvette Nicole Brown, and follows four cosplayers each week as they put their skills to the test as they create innovative cosplays, having to not only create the costume, but also act the part of the character for a realistic performance. Guiding and critiquing the contestants are international cosplayer LeeAnna Vamp, and Christian Beckman, the costume creator for The Hunger Games and Tron: Legacy. At the end of every episode each week, the winner of that particular competition is awarded with $10,000.

Contestants
In each episode, there are two rounds. The first requires the contestants to make a small test piece, and one is eliminated and one receives a bonus for the second round, where they create their full characters, and a contestant is selected as the winner of the episode.

Episodes

Production
The series was announced in February 2017 by Heather Olander, the senior Vice President of Syfy.

Christian Beckman, a judge on the series, has done costume work for Tron: Legacy, The Hunger Games, The Last Airbender, Star Trek, Where the Wild Things Are, War of the Worlds and I Am Legend, as well as having been part of the team that created the mechanical arms for Doctor Octopus in Spider-Man 2.

Broadcast
Cosplay Melee premiered its first season of six episodes in the U.S. on March 21, 2017 at 10/9c on Syfy. The series premiered on June 13, 2017 in Canada on Space.

References

External links
 
 

2010s American reality television series
2017 American television series debuts
Cosplay
English-language television shows
Syfy original programming
Television series by Matador Content
2017 American television series endings